René Gerber (29 June 1908; Travers, Switzerland – 21 October 2006; Bevaix) was a Swiss composer. A student of Paul Dukas and Nadia Boulanger, among others, he taught at the Collège 
Latin (Neuchâtel) and became the director of the Conservatoire de Musique de Neuchâtel.

An exponent of neoclassicism and “French clarity”, his compositions follow traditional forms. He composed symphonic music (including the orchestral suite "The Old Farmer's Almanach"), 15 concertos, chamber music, vocal music, piano music, a work for organ, two operas inspired by Shakespeare plays (Romeo and Juliet, Midsummer Night’s Dream).

References

20th-century classical composers
Swiss male composers
1908 births
2006 deaths
20th-century male musicians
20th-century Swiss composers